Mechery Louis Ouseppachan (born 13 September 1955), known mononymously as Ouseppachan, is an Indian film composer and singer who primarily works in Malayalam films. He is a recipient of National Film Award, Filmfare Award and Kerala State Film Awards for his numerous film soundtrack albums and background scores.

Early life

Ouseppachan was born to Mechery Louis and Mathiri Paliakkara on 13 September 1955 in Ollur, Thrissur, Kerala, India. He completed his formal education from St. Thomas College, Thrissur. He was interested in music and by the time he finished his formal education, he had become an expert violinist.

Career
He started his music career as violinist in some music troupes including Voice of Trichur. Later he got the chance to be the violinist in concerts of renowned playback singer Madhuri. He later became the violinist under music director Paravoor Devarajan master.
Then he moved to Madras, Tamil Nadu where most of the recording works of Malayalam films were done. 

His first work in the film industry was the film Eenam, for which he set the background score. He also composed additional background music for the film Aaravam (1979) in which he also played the role of a fiddle player, however Kathodu Kathoram (1985), directed by Bharathan is considered as his debut. Ouseppachan's work was noted for the film and three songs from the film became super hits. These songs were noted also for the immense use of violin. This may be attributed to the facts that Ousephachan himself is a violinist and that the protagonist of the film played by Mammootty is also a violinist.

Ousephachan then went on to compose music for over 120 films. He also composed songs for the non-commercial Hindi film Freaky Chakra, directed by V.K. Prakash and background scores for various other Hindi films, notably directed by Priyadarshan. His non-film songs include popular albums like Onapoothalam, Vasanthageetangal and many Christian devotional songs. Aside from music direction, he had taken up a spot as a judge for Asianet's Idea Star Singer 2008 and also as a judge for Kairali TV's Gandharva Sangeetham 2012. He got his first state award in 1987 for the movie Unnikale Oru Kadha Parayam. His first national award was for ace director Shyamaprasad's Ore Kadal in 2007. All the songs in this film are composed in Shubhapantuvarali raga but all have their identity. Apparently, it is a challenge given to Ouseppachan by the director and he took up the challenge. His recent notable films are Ayalum Njanum Thammil, Nadan. For Nadan, he recreated the classical drama songs from the classical K.P.A.C era. He received a state award for this film for Best Music Director. Acclaimed music composers like A.R.Rahman, Vidyasagar, Harris Jayaraj, Gopi Sunder etc., has assisted him in various stages of his career and playback singer Franco Simon is his nephew.

Selected Discography

Awards 
National Film Awards:

 2007 – Best Music Direction: Ore Kadal

Filmfare Awards South:

 2007 – Filmfare Award for Best Music Director – Malayalam: Ore Kadal

Kerala State Film Awards:

 1987 – Best Music Director: Unnikale Oru Kadha Parayam
 2007 – Best Background Music: Ore Kadal
 2013 – Best Music Director: Nadan

References

External links
 
 Ouseppachan at MSI

1954 births
Living people
Musicians from Thrissur
Kerala State Film Award winners
Malayalam film score composers
St. Thomas College, Thrissur alumni
Filmfare Awards South winners
Best Music Direction National Film Award winners
Film musicians from Kerala
20th-century Indian composers
21st-century Indian composers
People from Thrissur
Male actors from Thrissur
Male actors in Malayalam cinema
Indian male film actors